Class 01 may refer to:

British Rail Class 01, a class of post-war British 0-4-0 diesel locomotive designed for use on tight curves and limited clearances
DRG Class 01, a class of German standard steam locomotive designed between the wars for express train services
DRG Class 01.10, a later, more powerful version of the DRG Class 01 above first delivered in 1939
Class 01, in the electrical Appliance classes

See also
 Class 1 (disambiguation)
 Class I (disambiguation)